George Eugene Eager (1859 – August 21, 1919) was the U.S. Consul in Barmen, Germany from 1907 to 1917 during World War I.

Biography
He was born on March 15, 1859, in Enfield, Massachusetts, to Clarissa Adaline and John Davis Eager. His siblings were Frederic Cutting Eager, Edwin Louis Eager, and William Eager. He married Ruth Fides Spalding on June 11, 1900, in Norwich, Connecticut.

He was the U.S. Consul in Barmen, Germany, from 1914 to 1917 during World War I.

He died on August 21, 1919, in Chicago.

External links
George Eugene Eager at WorldCat

References

1859 births
1919 deaths
People from Enfield, Massachusetts
American consuls
Ambassadors of the United States to Germany